The canton of La Bresse is an administrative division of the Vosges department, in northeastern France. It was created at the French canton reorganisation which came into effect in March 2015. Its seat is in La Bresse.

It consists of the following communes:

Basse-sur-le-Rupt
La Bresse
Cornimont
Faucompierre
La Forge
Gerbamont
Rochesson
Sapois
Saulxures-sur-Moselotte
Le Syndicat
Tendon
Thiéfosse
Le Tholy
Vagney
Ventron

References

Cantons of Vosges (department)